Sofía Castro Ríos (born 18 September 1970) is a Mexican lawyer and politician affiliated with the Institutional Revolutionary Party. As of 2014 he served as Deputy of the LIX and LXI Legislatures of the Mexican Congress representing Oaxaca.

Castro Ríos is a candidate for the LXV Legislature of the Mexican Congress.

References

1970 births
Living people
Politicians from Oaxaca
20th-century Mexican lawyers
Women members of the Chamber of Deputies (Mexico)
Institutional Revolutionary Party politicians
21st-century Mexican politicians
21st-century Mexican women politicians
Mexican women lawyers
Members of the Congress of Oaxaca
Benito Juárez Autonomous University of Oaxaca alumni
Members of the Chamber of Deputies (Mexico) for Oaxaca
21st-century Mexican lawyers